Kristie Lynn Fox (born September 16, 1985) is an American, former collegiate All-American softball shortstop and current head coach for UNLV Rebels softball team. She attended Mt. Carmel High School and later played for the Arizona Wildcats softball team from 2004 to 2007. Fox led the Wildcats to back-to-back Women's College World Series championships in 2006 and 2007.

Playing career

College career
Fox debuted on February 6, 2004 vs. the New Mexico Lobos in a 2/3 performance, including tallying a double. In her sophomore campaign, she earned First Team All-Pac-12 honors and was named a National Fastpitch Coaches Association First Team All-American. As a junior, she repeated conference and NFCA honors and helped lead the Wildcats into the World Series.  For her senior year, she would maintain her conference recognition and led the team at the 2007 World Series by batting .500 for the series and in her second finale appearance, she had a hit and walked twice against 2007 National Player of The Year Monica Abbott for the Tennessee Lady Vols. She was named to the All-Tournament team and graduated from the university ranking top-10 in career RBIs, where she currently remains for the Wildcats.

Professional career
She was selected fifth overall in 2007 NPF Draft and played three season from 2007 to 2009, winning the first title for the Chicago Bandits team in 2008.

Coaching career
Fox served as an assistant softball coach at the University of Arizona, Murray State University, and Texas Tech University, before serving as the head softball coach at the University of Texas at Arlington from 2013 to 2017. Fox was named head softball coach at the University of Nevada, Las Vegas on July 20, 2017.

Statistics

Head coaching record

References

External links
 
 UNLV bio
 UT Arlington bio

1985 births
Living people
Female sports coaches
American softball coaches
Arizona Wildcats softball coaches
Arizona Wildcats softball players
Softball players from California
Murray State Racers coaches
Texas Tech Red Raiders softball coaches
UNLV Rebels softball coaches
UT Arlington Mavericks coaches
Sportspeople from San Diego
Chicago Bandits players